The 1900 United States presidential election in Maine took place on November 6, 1900 as part of the 1900 United States presidential election. Voters chose six representatives, or electors to the Electoral College, who voted for president and vice president.

Maine overwhelmingly voted for the Republican nominee, President William McKinley, over the Democratic nominee, former U.S. Representative and 1896 Democratic presidential nominee William Jennings Bryan. McKinley won Maine by a margin of 27.85% in this rematch of the 1896 United States presidential election. The return of economic prosperity and recent victory in the Spanish–American War helped McKinley to score a decisive victory. Nonetheless, Bryan’s narrow victory in Knox County was the only occasion between 1884 and 1908 that a Democrat carried any of Maine’s counties, and one of only two such cases between 1856 and 1908 inclusive.

With 61.89% of the popular vote, Maine would be McKinley's third strongest victory in terms of percentage in the popular vote after Vermont and North Dakota.

Results

Results by county

See also
 United States presidential elections in Maine

Notes

References

Maine
1900
1900 Maine elections